The Trio 1 is a live album by pianist Cedar Walton, bassist David Williams and drummer Billy Higgins recorded in 1985 and first released on the Italian Red label.

Reception

AllMusic reviewer Scott Yanow awarded the album 4 stars stating, "There have been many Cedar Walton records put out through the years and the three that he and his trio made during a Bologna concert in 1985 rank with his best... easily recommended to straightahead jazz collectors."

Track listing 
All compositions by Cedar Walton except as indicated
 "My Ship" (Ira Gershwin, Kurt Weill) – 9:50
 "Ev'ry Time We Say Goodbye" (Cole Porter) – 8:15
 "Satin Doll" (Duke Ellington, Johnny Mercer, Billy Strayhorn) – 6:20
 "Lover Man" (Jimmy Davis, Roger "Ram" Ramirez, Jimmy Sherman) – 5:15
 "Holy Land" – 8:55
 "Voices Deep Within Me" – 10:40

Personnel 
Cedar Walton – piano
David Williams – bass
Billy Higgins – drums

References 

Cedar Walton live albums
1986 live albums
Red Records live albums